The Vermilion Pencil was the official register of imperial decrees in Imperial China. Like other oriental monarchies, official sanction of all public acts were conveyed by the impression of a seal. Any remark or directive of the emperor of China was written in red, commonly styled "the vermilion pencil."

See also

Hanlin Academy
Qing dynasty

References
The Vermilion Pencil - New York Times - May 27, 1884

Political history of China